= Sturgeon Branch, West Virginia =

- Unincorporated community
- Location within West Virginia Location within the United States
- Coordinates: 37°56′16″N 80°49′4″W
- Country: United States
- State: West Virginia
- County: Fayette
- Elevation: 2,431 ft (741 m)
- Time zone: UTC-5 (Eastern (EST))
  - Summer (DST): UTC-4 (EDT)
- GNIS ID: 1559374

Sturgeon Branch was an unincorporated community in Fayette County, West Virginia, United States.
